The 99 is a 2011–2012 animated series directed by Dave Osborne and based on the comic book series of the same name created by Naif Al-Mutawa.

The series was planned to air on the TV channel The Hub in the United States, but didn't make it due to controversy.

Plot 

Dr Ramzi Razem and The 99 are introduced and they realise for what they should be using their powers. Friendship and cooperation across differing cultures is one of the driving sentiments in the stories.

The mysterious Rughal wishes to harness the power of the powerful noor stones for his own gains. "Noor" is Arabic for "light".

Voice Cast 

 Bruce Hayward as Doctor Ramzi Razem (season 1)
 Darren Osborne as Doctor Ramzi Razem (season 2)
 Erich Boehm as Rughal (season 1)
 Justin Krawczyk as Rughal (season 2)
 Sara-Clare Lajeunesse as Dana Ibrahim ("Noora the Light")
 Aris Athanasopoulos as Nawaf Al Bilali ("Jabbar the Powerful")
 Simon Miron as "Jabbar the Powerful" (season 2)
 Lamont James as John Weller ("Darr the Afflicter")
 Cole Promane as Miklos Szekelyhidi ("Jami the Assembler")
 Dominique Kamras as Catarina Barbosa ("Mumita the Destroyer")
 Jessie Behan as Alex ("Raqib the Watcher")
 Kaitlin Mamie as Alex ("Raqib the Watcher") (season 2)
 Dave Pender as Zoran
 Jacob James as James Higgins ("Red Shroud")
 David Godfrey as Thiab Al-Daham ("Blackwolf") / Various
 Daniel Davis as Guenther Gerhardt ("Hammerforce")
 Matthew Gorman as Toro Ridwan ("Fattah the Opener")
 Ty Kostyk as Jianyu ("The Savage")
 Scott Lancastle as Professor Mindo / Murk
 David Findlay as The Pathologist
 Al Kussin as The Pathologist
 Andrew Barbosa as Jaleel the Majestic
 Matt Hardy as Awang / Ben Hargreaves
 Ashleigh Midanik as Rafie the Lifter / Murat
 Sylvie Pamphile as Sphinx
 Kimberly Persona as Rola Hadramy ("Batina the Hidden")
 Trevhon Samuel as Bari the Healer
 Lisa Seward as Buran
 Amanda Jane Smith as Mujiba the Responder
 Sasha White as Aleem the All Knowing
 Dave Roberts as Kyra Wiseman / Badr / News Reporter / Parking Officer
 Conrad Bailey as Rahisia
 Steven Boleantu as Salaam
 Laura Caswell as Christa Clahane
 Shawn Devlin as Tom King
 David Fenner as Husam /  Shireer
 Alex Fiddes as Mourad
 Vivian Hisey as Rabiah
 Danny MacDonald as Fakir
 Erica McMaster as Ingrid Wirsig
 Chelsea Oswald as Noaf
 Zach Smadu as Budi
 Brian R. Sousa as Laval
 Grant Tilley as Rami
 Eric Boehm as Jeri Craden
 Supinder Wraich as Hadya the Guide
 Christa Clahone as Hadya the Guide
 Zena Driver as Widad the Loving
 Aaron Fisher as Dee
 Bill Hunt as Amanda Mountsford
 Kris Siddiqi as Razors Edge
 Daniel James as Razors Edge
 Tim Keele as The Guardian
 Erin Pitt as Samda the Invulnerable
 Victoria Lacquaniti as Samda the Invulnerable
 Brooke Mackay as Posy
 Nica Michaels as Baqi the Everlasting
 Eric Miinch as Mukit the Nourisher
 John Palmieri as Nestor Rios
 Tanya Ritoul as Mussawira the Organiser
 Clara Scott as Wassi the Vast
 Benny Feng as Wassi the Vast / Ashok
 Emily Coutts as Mubdia the Creative Twins
 Braedon Soltys as Mubdi the Creative Twins
 Joseph Woods as Baeth the Sender
 Marni Van Dyk as Baeth the Sender
 Mena Massoud as Hafiz the Preserver / Dave /  Saad

Background, motivation, financing and production 
The TV series is based on the comic book series The 99 created by Kuwait-born and United States-educated Naif Al-Mutawa who felt Muslim children needed a new set of heroes to look up to, to counter jihadist role models. In a 2011 interview with Fox News, Al-Mutawa was quoted "When those guys hijacked those airplanes [on Sept. 11] and committed a crime in the name of my religion, they put a stain on my religion that only God can erase. But they not only hijacked those planes, they hijacked what Islam meant." He also expressed a desire to bridge the cultural divide between the East and the West and said that though he used an Islamic archetype, the stories don't mention Islam, Allah or the Koran but are instead based on values shared by everybody. The comic books were both praised and criticised: In 2009, the comic book series was named as one of the top 20 trends in the world by Forbes magazine and was praised by Barack Obama for attempting to improve dialogue between the US and the Muslim world.   

In November 2006 a Bahrain investment bank approved $25 million to help fnance Teshkeel Media Group and pay to launch an animated series for television. A 13 episode first season of the series was announced, but was later changed to 26 episodes. In total, 52 episodes were produced.

Around 300 people, with director Osborne and Naif in London, an animation team in India a voice recording team in Canada and writers in Los Angeles, worked on the series for over two-and-a-half years. Director Osborne, with more than 20 years of animation experience and having worked at Cosgrove Hall, called The 99 the most technically complex project he had ever been involved in.

Creator Naif Al-Mutawa and his work on the comic books and the TV series were the subjects of the 60 minutes long PBS documentary Wham! Bam! Islam! by Isaac Solotaroff broadcast in October 2011 as the season premiere of PBS's series "Independent Lens".

The interactive website the99kids.com was designed by Aardman Animations.

Episodes

Marketing, promotion and reception 
A preview was released on The 99'''s own website and YouTube, in December 2009.

The series met with some resistance in the USA to some part because of the character Batina the Hidden wearing a burqa and a couple of the characters wearing the hijab. In other parts of the world the series was criticized because not all the female characters were covered in some way.

In 2014, several months after the show had been off the air in Saudi Arabia, a fatwa was issued from the Grand Mufti of Saudi Arabia and the Higher Council of Clerics calling the work "evil". Naif Al-Mutawa asked the Higher Council of Clerics to reconsider, highlighting that The 99 was based on values like generosity and mercy and had created positive role models for children using Islam as a base for its storytelling. He also asked the work be judged by its intent.

 Awards 
Ashleigh Midanik was nominated to the 2013 Young Artist Award for Best Performance in a Voice-Over Role – Television – Young Actress for the portrayal of Rafie the Lifter / Murat.

 The 99 Unbound 
The first few episodes were released as a feature film, The 99 Unbound in 2011, telling the origins of the core group and how they come to terms with their powers.

 References 

 External links 
 
 The 99'', 26 Episodes in English on YouTube
 
 The 99 – Official fan site for The 99 Universe

2011 British television series debuts
2012 British television series endings
2010s British animated television series
British children's animated superhero television series
Kuwaiti television series
Toonami